S. vernalis  may refer to:
 Senecio vernalis, the Eastern groundsel, a plant species
 Stokesia vernalis, a single-celled ciliate protozoa species

See also
 Vernalis (disambiguation)